Kyle Ensing (born March 6, 1997) is an American indoor volleyball player plays as an opposite hitter on the United States men's national volleyball team. On club level, he plays for Saint-Nazaire Volley-Ball Atlantique in France.

Personal life
Ensing is from Santa Clarita, California and attended high school at Valencia High School. His brother, Eric, also played volleyball at Long Beach State.

Career

Long Beach State
Ensing played at Long Beach State, where he made the final four all four years, winning NCAA titles in 2018 and 2019.

Professional clubs

  Berlin Recycling Volleys (2019–2020)
  Maccabi Tel Aviv (2020–2022)
  Saint-Nazaire VBA (fr) (2022–)

National team

Ensing has participated in four major tournaments with the USA men's national team: 2018, 2019 and 2021 FIVB Volleyball Men's Nations League and 2019 Men's NORCECA Volleyball Championship. In June 2021, he was named to the 12-player 2020 Summer Olympics roster.

Honors and awards

Professional clubs

2021–2022 Israeli Premier League –  Champions, with Maccabi Tel Aviv
2021–2022 Israeli Cup –  Champions, with Maccabi Tel Aviv
2020–2021 Israeli Premier League –  Champions, with Maccabi Tel Aviv
2019–2020 German Volleyball Cup –  Champions, with Berlin Recycling Volleys
2019–2020 German Super Cup –  Champions, with Berlin Recycling Volleys

Individual awards
 2017: AVCA Second-Team All-American
 2018: AVCA First-Team All-American
 2018: All-Big West First-Team
 2018: NCAA National Championship – All Tournament Team
 2019: All-Big West First-Team (Player of the Year)
 2019: AVCA First-Team All-American

References

1997 births
Living people
Sportspeople from Santa Clarita, California
American men's volleyball players
Long Beach State Beach men's volleyball players
American expatriate sportspeople in Germany
Expatriate volleyball players in Germany
American expatriate sportspeople in Israel
Expatriate volleyball players in Israel
American expatriate sportspeople in France
Expatriate volleyball players in France
Volleyball players at the 2020 Summer Olympics
Olympic volleyball players of the United States